Gerald Basset (born 22 October 1990) is a Seychellois football midfielder who plays for Côte d'Or FC.

References

1990 births
Living people
Seychellois footballers
Seychelles international footballers
Cote d'Or FC players
Association football midfielders